Amylostereum laevigatum is a species of crust fungus in the family Amylostereaceae. Originally named Thelephora laevigata by Elias Fries in 1828, it was given its current name when transferred to the genus Amylostereum by French mycologist Jacques Boidin in 1958.

Ecology
Amylostereum laevigatum is known from Norway, Sweden, France, Switzerland, Canada and the United States, where it occurs on Abies, Juniperus, Taxus and Thuja. The fungus first appeared in Japan as a symbiont of the Japanese horntail (Urocerus japonicus), being injected into the sapwood of the Japanese cedar (Cryptomeria japonica) and the Japanese cypress (Chamaecyparis obtusa) trees when the female horntail oviposited beneath the bark.

References

External links

Russulales
Fungi of Europe
Fungi described in 1828
Taxa named by Elias Magnus Fries